The Hospital Israelita Albert Einstein (English: Albert Einstein Israelite Hospital) is a Brazilian hospital, located in the Morumbi district, on the south side of São Paulo. It is considered the best hospital in Latin America and is among the top 50 in the world.

History
A group of Jewish community members in São Paulo founded the Sociedade Beneficente Israelita Brasileira Albert Einstein (SBIBAE) in 1955. The SBIBAE began construction of the Albert Einstein Hospital three years later on 14 September 1958 on land donated by Ema Gordon Klabin. The hospital was inaugurated on 28 July 1971.

In 1999, it was the first health institution outside the United States to be certified by the Joint Commission International.

Ophthalmologist Dr. Cláudio Lottenberg began as president of the Albert Einstein in December 2001.

On December 29, 2022, famous footballer Pelé died after receiving treatment for cancer in this hospital.

Care and Programs
It is one of the most well-known health units in Brazil due to the quality of care, medical equipment and expertise at its disposal to address the main types of pathologies. It has a social assistance program in the Paraisópolis favela, near the hospital.

The Albert Einstein also hosts a nursing school as well as a medical school (since 2016). As of 2022, a new undergraduate degree in business administration with an emphasis in health organization management will be inaugurated.

See also
 List of hospitals in Brazil
 History of the Jews in Brazil
Pelé

References

External links
 Official website

Hospitals in São Paulo
Albert Einstein
1955 establishments in Brazil
Hospitals established in 1955
Hospital buildings completed in 1971
Jewish medical organizations